Dawn is a 1985 French-Israeli drama film directed by Miklós Jancsó. It was entered into the 36th Berlin International Film Festival. The film was a French-Israeli co-production, and the French Ministry of Culture co-financed the production.

Plot
Starring the British Michael York and Philip Lautard of France. "Dawn" takes place during the British Mandatory Palestine, in 1947. The story follows one night in the life of a young man, a Jewish Holocaust survivor named Elisha, who was guarding a British prisoner during that night, in order to execute him at dawn. This, in retaliation for the killing of members of the Jewish underground. The story is based on The Sergeants affair, the abduction of two British Sergeants by the Irgun and their hanging in a grove in Netanya.

Cast
 Serge Avedikian
 Paul Blain
 Christine Boisson as Llana
 Philippe Léotard as Gad
 Redjep Mitrovitsa as Elisha
 Michael York as John Dawson

See also 
 Dawn (2014)

References

External links

1985 films
1985 drama films
French drama films
Hungarian drama films
1980s French-language films
Films directed by Miklós Jancsó
Films set in Mandatory Palestine
Films set in the 1940s
Films about terrorism
Films based on American novels
1980s French films